Foreverlin is an American Christian alternative indie rock band, and they are from the cities of Cheyenne and Laramie, Wyoming, where the band started making music in 2012. They released, an extended play, Per Sempre in 2012, followed by two studio albums, Long Lost in 2013, with Red Cord Records, and, Still After in 2014, from Pando Records.  In 2017, Foreverlin released an EP entitled You Remain, which features covers of worship songs, the Doxology, and an original worship song (title track).

Background
Foreverlin is a Christian alternative indie rock band from the towns of Cheyenne and Laramie, Wyoming, where they formed in 2012. Their members are lead vocalist and guitarist, Peter Blomberg, guitarist and background vocalist, Caleb Blomberg, bassist and background vocalist, Nathan Theissen, and drummer and background vocalist, Burke Florom.

Music history
The band started as a musical entity in early 2012, with their first release, Per Sempre, an extended play, that was released on March 6, 2012, independently. Their subsequent release, a studio album, Long Lost, was released on April 30, 2013, from Red Cord Records. The single, "Long Lost", charted on the Billboard magazine Christian Rock chart at No. 27.  They released, Still After, a studio album, with Pando Records, on May 19, 2015. This release saw, "Broken Lines", chart at No. 13 on the Billboard magazine Christian Rock chart. as well as, Speak, which charted at No. 15.

Many shows in Foreverlin's past have seen the band incorporating worship songs into their sets and playing Sunday morning church services.  Wanting to show this side of the band, they recorded a 5-song EP entitled You Remain.  This EP included four cover songs and one original.  The title track, You Remain, charted at No. 29 in the spring of 2017.  Anthony Riedl (bass, vocals) left the band right before recording started, but still was able to record the bass tracks.  After he left, Foreverlin invited Nathan Thiessen to tour with them as their bassist.  Nathan Thiessen is an accomplished violinist from Iowa who played violin on both the Long Lost and Still After albums (Alaska, Broken Lines, Josephine), but also plays other instruments, including bass.

During 2017, Foreverlin also spent more time on the road touring - traveling mostly in the Western side of the United States.  They also spent time during the summer leading worship at youth Bible camps.

Members
Current members
 Peter Donald Blomberg – lead vocals, lead guitar
 Caleb Donald Blomberg – guitar, background vocals
 Nathan Thiessen – bass, background vocals
 Burke Wayne Florom – drums, background vocals

Discography
Studio albums
 Long Lost (April 30, 2013, Red Cord)
 Still After (May 19, 2015, Pando)
EPs
 Per Sempre (March 6, 2012, independent)
 You Remain (January 20, 2017, independent)
Singles

References

External links
Official website

Rock music groups from Wyoming
Musical groups established in 2012
2012 establishments in Wyoming
American Christian rock groups
American alternative rock groups